Eastman Business Park, formerly Kodak Park, is a large manufacturing and industrial complex in the city of Rochester, New York, in the United States. The complex runs parallel to New York State Route 104 and Mount Read Boulevard for most of its length. Also part of the complex is the Kodak Center performing arts center and conference facility. 

Eastman Business Park is serviced by both CSX, via the Charlotte Running Track, and Norfolk Southern, via the Rochester and Southern Railroad. The plant also maintains an intra-plant railroad. It was formerly serviced by the Rochester Subway via the Dewey Avenue surface connection.

The ashes of Eastman Kodak founder George Eastman are buried here.

History 

In the decades following 1890, Kodak Park was constructed to meet the massive demand of Eastman Kodak Company's photographic and motion picture film products. The park would eventually become the largest photographic product manufacturing facility in the world, employing over 15,000 employees in over 154 different buildings spanning its 1,300 acres.

In the mid-2000s, Eastman Kodak began downsizing its film manufacturing operations due to the shrinking demand for film. A number of unused buildings were demolished in 2007.

On November 11, 2008, Eastman Kodak officially renamed Kodak Park "Eastman Business Park" and began an aggressive marketing campaign to attract new tenants to the park.

During the bankruptcy of Eastman Kodak in 2012, Eastman Kodak began selling off a number of large assets in Eastman business park as it continued to downsize; this included its coal power plant, as well numerous other land and building assets.

The park has been used as a filming location for several television series and films, including the 2019 automobile racing reality competition series Hyperdrive.

Controversy 
In 2012 it was revealed that Kodak had stored uranium in an underground lab for almost 30 years. The material was used for research in a Californium neutron flux multiplier. Although the uranium was considered weapons-grade, it was not present in large enough quantities to construct a weapon with.

Companies and institutions in or near the Eastman Business Park
As Eastman Kodak downsized, the manufacturing facilities were leased out to both established and start-up manufacturing companies.  Members of Eastman Business Park Include:

 Acquest Development
 American Fuel Cell
 Arnprior
 Cardinal Logistics Mgmt.
 Carestream Health
 Cerion Nanomaterials
 Columbia Care LLC
 DNV KEMA Energy & Sustainability
 DuPont Danisco
 Eastman Kodak Company
 Eastman Park Micrographics
 ESL Federal Credit Union
 Excell Partners Inc.
 Empire Digital Signs
 Energy Materials Corporation
 LiDestri Foods
 Lumisyn
 Genencor International
 George Eastman Museum-Film Preservation Services
 Graphenix
 Great Lakes Environmental
 GreenLight Biosciences
 Guardsmark
 Harris Corporation 9(formerly Exelis)
 Intrinsiq Materials
 IMAX
 Kingsbury Corporation
 Kodak Alaris
 Khuri Enterprises
 Molecular Glasses
 Natcore Technologies
 Naturally Scientific US
 NOHMs Technologies Inc.
 NY-BEST Test Commercialization Center / DNV-GL
 Novomer
 Oak Ridge National Laboratory
 OmniID
 ON Semiconductor
 Optimation
 Orthogonal
 Ortho Clinical Diagnostics
 Premise Health / AO Safety
 Proton Innovations
 Quintel
 RAPA (Rochester Association of Performing Arts)
 RED (Recycled Energy Development Co.)
 R-Display & Lighting
 Rochester Silver Works
 Safety Solutions
 SiGNa Chemistry
 Transparent Materials
 VFX
 Xpedx
 Yaro Enterprises

Future of Eastman Business Park
Eastman Business Park has been described as a vital part of Rochester, NY's economic growth efforts. State and local governments and Eastman Kodak Company itself have been steadily working towards turning Eastman Business Park into an innovation hub which would attract large companies as well as small start up companies with a focus on green-tech, photonics, optics and material science to the park.

See also
Eastman Kodak Company
Rochester, New York

References

External links
 Eastman Business Park
 Eastman Kodak

Industrial buildings and structures in Rochester, New York
Industrial parks in the United States
Kodak
1890 establishments in New York (state)